{{DISPLAYTITLE:C12H18N2}}
The molecular formula C12H18N2 (molar mass: 190.29 g/mol, exact mass: 190.1470 u) may refer to:

 Methylbenzylpiperazine (MBZP), or 1-methyl-4-benzylpiperazine